28th regimes are legal frameworks of European Union rules which do not replace national rules but are an optional alternative to them, for example the European Company Statute, unitary patent, and Union authorization under the Biocidal Products Directive.

Notes and references

European Union laws